Luis Alberto Romero Amarán (born April 7, 1979 in Matanzas) is a Cuban former cyclist, who competed professionally between 2008 and 2016.

Major results

1999
 1st  National Time Trial Championships
 3rd Overall Vuelta Ciclista de Chile
1st Stage 3
2000
 1st  National Time Trial Championships
 1st Stage 4 Vuelta a Cuba
2001
 1st  National Time Trial Championships
 2nd Overall Vuelta a Cuba
 3rd National Road Race Championships
2003
 1st Stage 12b Vuelta a Cuba
2005
 1st  National Time Trial Championships
 2nd Overall Vuelta a Cuba
2006
 4th GP Capodarco
 10th Gara Ciclistica Montappone
2007
 1st Stages 5a (ITT) & 5b Vuelta a Tenerife
 1st Stage 5 Vuelta a Galicia
 1st Stage 4 Vuelta a Ávila
 3rd Overall Vuelta a Segovia
1st Stage 3
2008
 1st Tour de Toona
 1st Stage 3 San Dimas Stage Race
 8th Overall Rochester Omnium
2009
 6th Overall Tour de San Luis
1st Stage 6
2010
 1st  Overall Joe Martin Stage Race
 5th Overall Tour of the Gila
1st Stage 2
2011
 1st  Overall Tour of Elk Grove
2012
 1st  Overall Valley of the Sun Stage Race
 1st Stage 2 Tulsa Tough
 1st Stage 2 Cascade Classic (ITT)
 6th Overall Tour do Rio
 9th Overall Tour of Elk Grove
2013
 1st Stage 1 Tour de Delta
 1st Stage 2 San Dimas Stage Race
 1st Stages 2 & 3 Redlands Bicycle Classic
 3rd Overall Valley of the Sun Stage Race
 3rd Clarendon Cup
2014
 1st Stage 4 Tour of the Gila
 1st Stage 3 Valley of the Sun Stage Race
 3rd Overall Grand Prix Cycliste de Saguenay

References

1979 births
Living people
Cuban male cyclists